Forst (Lausitz) is a border railway station located in Forst (Lausitz), Germany. The station is located on the Cottbus–Forst railway and the former Forst–Guben and Weißwasser–Forst railway lines. A few hundred meters east of the station the German Cottbus–Forst railway connects to Poland's Łódź Kaliska–Tuplice railway.

Train services 

The station is serves by the following service(s):

Local services  Cottbus – Forst (hourly)
Local services  Forst – Żary (twice daily)

Until mid-December 2014 the station was also served by EuroCity "Wawel", which used to run once daily between Berlin Hauptbahnhof and Wrocław Główny.

References

External links 
 

Railway stations in Brandenburg
Buildings and structures in Spree-Neiße
railway station